The Club Atlético de San Isidro (mostly known for its acronym CASI) is an Argentine sports club based in the city of San Isidro in Greater Buenos Aires. Originally established as a football club, San Isidro has gained recognition for its rugby union team, holding a record of 33 Torneo de la URBA championships. The senior squad currently competes at Top 12, the top division of the Unión de Rugby de Buenos Aires league system.

San Isidro has also a notable past in football, with 26 consecutive seasons (from 1906 until 1931) playing in Primera División, the top division of Argentine football league system until the club disaffiliated from the Association when the sport became professional in Argentina. Until then, San Isidro had achieved some international titles such as three Copa de Competencia Jockey Club, one Copa de Honor Municipalidad de Buenos Aires and one international Tie Cup. Nowadays, football is practised at the institution with youth and senior amateur competitions for men and women.

The field hockey section has women's and men's team competing at Metropolitano championships organised by the Buenos Aires Hockey Association.

Apart from rugby, hockey and football, other disciplines hosted by San Isidro are artistic gymnastics, basque pelota, bowls, gaelic football, golf, squash, swimming, taekwondo and tennis.

History

Beginning and football years

At the beginning of 1902, a group of young men started to practise football in a field placed in the lowest part of the hill (called "la barranca" in Spanish). That land was the property of María Varela de Beccar, an aristocratic woman that allowed them to play there. Nevertheless, the frequent swells of the Río de la Plata interrupted the matches many times, causing the boys to stop playing the sport they loved. This circumstance plus the adding of a wide group of football enthusiasts that joined them to play, made the boys to think about founding a club.

That group of boys was encouraged by some respectable neighbours of the zone, such as Pedro Becco or Manuel Aguirre, and even Avelino Rolón (who was Intendent of San Isidro Partido in 1906). As a result, soon after Aguirre led part of the lands for an indefinite period of time, where "Club de Foot-ball San Isidro" was founded.

By that time (May 1902) a group (formed by English natives and sons of British), most of them employees of the Central Argentine Railway also began to play football in a field next to the railroad station. Those boys founded a club naming it "San Isidro Athletic Club". Soon after that foundation, in the house of Paterson family, Mr. Hudson, McCrindle, Drenan and Ruiz; and Fernando Tiscornia, Manuel Vernet y Pedro Becco (son) as representatives of both clubs, agreed to call to a general assembly with the purpose of merging both clubs into one.

That meeting was celebrated on 24 October 1902, in the "Vignoles hotel" of San Isidro. 33 members of both clubs attended to the meeting, giving their approval to the merge of both clubs, which result was the foundation of "Club Atlético San Isidro".

The club registered with the Argentine Football Association to play the Segunda División until 1905 when the team promoted to the top level, Primera División.

San Isidro played all the Primera División championships from 1906 to 1931, disaffiliating from AFA when football became professional in Argentina (although the squad remained one season in the amateur league before the two associations merged in 1934). In words from then president of the club, Eduardo Sackmann, "football as a gentlemen and amateur sport, is not for real anymore".

During its football years, San Isidro won one international title, the Tie Cup (played between the Argentine and Uruguayan champions of Copa de Competencia) in 1912, and four domestic cups: three Copa de Competencia and one Copa de Honor. Despite those honours, San Isidro could not win any Primera División championship, being runner-up in 1912, 1913, and 1915.

Since then, football has been practised at CASI –at amateur level– to present, with senior, youth, children and women squads competing in the tournaments organised by the club.

Rugby union

The first rugby team of San Isidro was formed in 1908, combining British-origin employees of the Central Argentine Railway and a few Argentine-born, but it was dissolved in 1911 without having participated in any competition. Six years later, and due to an initiative by club president Rafael Cullen, San Isidro established a new rugby team, registering with the River Plate Rugby Union that same year. San Isidro won its first title in 1917, setting a record of 13 consecutive championships won (until 1930).

In 1935 the club held the traditional meeting with the rival team after a match, where no women attended. During the dinner, one of the guests spilled a cup of wine over his pants, which he took off and continued eating. The rest of the players that were sat at the table showed their solidarity with him and also took their pants and continued with the dinner as if nothing had happened.

This was seen by a member of the club who related the incident to club's authorities. As a result, eleven players were suspended by CASI for periods from one to two years. Since the suspension was effective, the team lost the most games played, finishing 6th at the end of the season (Atlético del Rosario was the champion).

At the end of 1935 Julio Urien was elected president of CASI for a new period, therefore the banned players left the club to found their own institution, which they called San Isidro Club (mostly known for its acronym "SIC" within rugby community). Since then, both clubs developed a strong rivalry which has remained to date.

San Isidro has won 33 URBA titles and one Nacional de Clubes to date, becoming the most winning rugby union club of Argentina. Within rugby community, San Isidro is mostly known for its acronym "CASI" instead of full name.

Field hockey
San Isidro was one of the founding members of Argentine Hockey Confederation, along with Belgrano A.C. and Pacific Railway A.C. The women's field hockey team won their first Metropolitano championships in the 1940s. The club inaugurated the first synthetic surface field in 2000. C.A. San Isidro currently has more than 700 players registered.

Uniform evolution
Football and rugby teams have worn different uniforms through the club's history. In football, the most representative uniform was the light blue jersey, which San Isidro worn during its tenure on Argentine Primera División until the team disaffiliated from the association when football became professional.

In rugby union, San Isidro's first colors were green and red since 1907, when the club opened its rugby section. Nevertheless, rugby section was closed in 1908, being inactive until 1916. In that year, the club wore a red shirt (taking the colors from the Facultad de Medicina team) to play their matches. In 1917 CA San Isidro affiliated to The River Plate Rugby Union, playing the RPRU championship (and winning their first title) still wearing the red shirt. For their second season in 1918, the black and white shirt was adopted, being chosen by president of the club, Rafael Cullen. The model was inspired on the kit of British side Barbarians. The black and white have been used by the rugby teams since then.

Football

Rugby union

Notes

Facilities 
The club has four facilities located in the San Isidro and Tigre Partido, which are:

 Headquarters, the main seat of the club, occupies 6 hectares near the commercial centre of San Isidro. Includes the club's stadium, nicknamed La Catedral, with capacity of 8,500. The stadium is also the usual venue for the Torneo de la URBA finals. Other facilities there include a field hockey synthetic grass field (venue of the senior squads), tennis courts, a football field (synthetic rubber surface), an auxiliar rugby field, swimming pools, basque pelota, paddle tennis and squash courts, gymnasium, contract bridge and billiards rooms, and a bowling green.
 La Boya: this home includes three rugby fields (one of them with artificial turf), field hockey field (synthetic), and gymnasium. 
 La Playita: situated on the edge of Río de la Plata, focused on the practise of surface water sports. It also has a beach volleyball court.
 Anexo Benavídez: in the homonymous city of Tigre Partido, has two rugby fields for children and youth teams of the club.
 San Isidro Labrador Golf: a 18-holes golf course

Rivalry
CASI main rival is the San Isidro Club (SIC) since both clubs were separated. This rivalry is so strong that has been nicknamed as "The Superclásico of Argentine rugby". As of April 2019, CASI and SIC have played 130 matches, with 68 won by CASI and 52 by SIC.

Highlights
 The first match played between SIC and CASI was on 9 May 1937, being SIC the winner by 3–0.
 The largest victory over SIC was a 51–7 on 25 August 2013.
 The most important derby played by CASI and SIC was the final of 2005 Torneo de la URBA championship, which CASI won 18–17 with a penalty in the last minutes, after 20 years without an URBA title.
 The largest defeat against SIC was a 55–18 on 28 August 2004.

Notable former rugby players

 Antonio Bilbao La Vieja
 Claudio Bincaz
 Arturo Rodríguez Jurado
 Jorge Stewart
 Ernesto Cilley
 Nicanor González del Solar 
 Alejandro Puccio
 Rodolfo O'Reilly 
 Gustavo Pagni
 Jorge Allen
 Christian Martin
 Gonzalo Beccar Varela
 Eliseo Branca
 Santiago Phelan (1992–2003) 
 Agustín Pichot (1992–97)
 Gabriel Travaglini
 Bruno María Devoto

Honours

Football
 Copa de Competencia Jockey Club (3): 1911, 1912, 1913
Copa de Honor MCBA (1): 1909
 Tie Cup (1): 1912

Rugby union
Nacional de Clubes (1): 1995
Torneo de la URBA (33): 1917, 1918, 1920, 1921, 1922, 1923, 1924, 1925, 1926, 1927, 1928, 1929, 1930, 1933, 1934, 1943, 1949, 1954, 1955, 1956, 1957, 1960, 1961, 1962, 1964, 1967, 1974, 1975, 1976, 1981, 1982, 1985, 2005

Field hockey

Men's
Metropolitano Primera División (4): 1908, 1921, 1926, 1948

Women's
Metropolitano Primera División (5): 1943, 1944, 1966, 1967, 1969

Notes

References

External links

 

Club Atlético San Isidro
s
s
s
s
s
s
s
S
s
C